is a Japanese-born physicist with notable contributions in the fields of particle physics and cosmology. He is currently a professor at the Center for Theoretical Physics at the University of California, Berkeley, and Director of the Kavli Institute for the Physics and Mathematics of the Universe at the University of Tokyo.

Biography 
Born in Japan in 1964, Murayama obtained his B.Sc. in Physics from the University of Tokyo in 1986. He completed his Ph.D. in Tokyo in 1991. In 1993, he emigrated to the US to join the Lawrence Berkeley National Laboratory as a post-doctoral research fellow. In 1995, he was appointed as an associate professor in University of California, Berkeley, where he became a full professor of physics in 2000. He is the founding director of the Kavli Institute for the Physics and Mathematics of the Universe (Kavli IPMU) at the University of Tokyo since 2007. In addition, he has been a visiting scientist at CERN since 2016.

In 2013, he was elected to the American Academy of Arts and Sciences and was chosen as a fellow of the American Physical Society. In October 2014, he delivered an invited lecture titled "Science for Peace and Development" at the Headquarters of the United Nations in an event honoring the 60th anniversary of CERN.

Scientific Work 
Professor Murayama is involved in the KamLAND neutrino experiment at the Kamioka Observatory, an underground neutrino detection facility near Toyama, Japan. The KamLAND collaboration won the Breakthrough Prize in Fundamental Physics in 2016.

In 1998, Murayama, Gian Giudice, Markus Luty and Riccardo Rattazzi discovered "anomaly mediated supersymmetry breaking, a subtle quantum mechanical mechanism which contributes to the gaugino masses in supergravity".

Awards and honors
 Humboldt Prize (2018)
 Breakthrough Prize in Fundamental Physics, as a member of the KamLAND collaboration
 Nishinomiya Yukawa Commemoration Prize in Theoretical Physics
 Fellow of American Physical Society 
 Member of Science Council of Japan
 Member of American Academy of Arts and Sciences
 Sloan Research Fellowship
 David Saxon Lecture 2012 (UCLA)

References

External links 

 

Japanese physicists
University of Tokyo alumni
Academic staff of the University of Tokyo
Japanese emigrants to the United States
Fellows of the American Academy of Arts and Sciences
Fellows of the American Physical Society
University of California, Berkeley faculty
Living people
People associated with CERN
Sloan Research Fellows
1964 births